The 1964 Puerto Rican general elections were held in Puerto Rico on 3 November 1964. Roberto Sánchez Vilella of the Popular Democratic Party was elected Governor, whilst the PPD also won a majority of the vote in the House of Representatives elections. Voter turnout was 83.8%.

Results

Governor

House of Representatives

References

Further reading 
Robert W. Anderson "Las elecciones de 1964 en Puerto Rico: Una evaluación." Revista de Ciencias Sociales, Vol. IX, No. 3, September 1965. Universidad de Puerto Rico. pp. 263–271.

Puerto Rico
General elections in Puerto Rico
Elections
Puerto Rico